John Quayle, KC (1693–1755) was a Manx lawyer who became the Clerk of the Rolls in the Isle of Man.

Biography
John Quayle was born in the Isle of Man in 1693, the son of Hugh Quayle. He married Elizabeth Harrison in 1717: the marriage produced five children. He became Clerk of the Rolls in 1736, his duties including the keeping of the public records of the Island, and taking evidence in special cases heard before the Manx Chancery Court.

John Quayle died in 1755, the cause of death being a fall from his horse. His body was buried at St Mary's Chapel, Castletown, Isle of Man.

References

1693 births
1755 deaths
Manx judges